This is a list of fluid flows named after people (eponymous flows).

See also
 Eponym
 List of hydrodynamic instabilities named after people
 List of laws in science
 Scientific phenomena named after people

References

Fluid flows
Fluid dynamics